Anna Mae Violet Hays ( McCabe; February 16, 1920 – January 7, 2018) was an American military officer who served as the 13th chief of the United States Army Nurse Corps. She was the first woman in the United States Armed Forces to be promoted to a general officer rank; in 1970, she was promoted to brigadier general. Hays paved the way for equal treatment of women, countered occupational sexism, and made a number of recommendations which were accepted into military policy.

Early life and education
Anna Mae Violet McCabe was born on February 16, 1920, in Buffalo, New York, the middle of three children. Her father was Daniel Joseph McCabe  (1881–1939), and her mother was the former Matie Florence Humphrey (1885–1961), who was of Welsh descent; both her parents were officers of The Salvation Army. Her elder brother was Daniel Joseph II, and her younger sister was Catherine Evangeline. 

During her childhood, the McCabe family moved several times in Western New York and the Lehigh Valley region of eastern Pennsylvania, ultimately settling in Allentown, Pennsylvania in 1932 when she was about 12 years old. Hays attended Allentown High School, now William Allen High School, graduating with honors in 1938. Hays had a love of music, playing the piano, the organ, and the French horn and wanted to go to Juilliard School to study music, but due to a lack of funds for tuition she decided to pursue nursing instead. Hays enrolled at the Allentown General Hospital School of Nursing in 1939, graduating in 1941 with a diploma in nursing. 

Later in her career, she earned a bachelor's degree in nursing education in 1958 from Columbia University in New York City and a Master of Science in Nursing degree in 1968 from The Catholic University of America in Washington, D.C.

Career

India
In May 1942, she joined the Army Nurse Corps, and was sent to India in January 1943 during World War II. She served with the 20th Field Hospital in Ledo in the northeastern region of Assam.

The hospital was stationed at the entrance to Ledo Road, which cut through jungles into Burma. The living and working conditions were primitive; buildings were made of bamboo, and dysentery, leeches and snakes were common, particularly during monsoon seasons. Just over two years later, in April 1945, she was promoted to first lieutenant.

After serving two and a half years in India, Hays was on leave in the United States when World War II ended. Remaining with the Corps, she served as an operating room nurse and later as a head nurse at Tilton General Hospital at Fort Dix, New Jersey; as obstetrics supervisor at Valley Forge General Hospital in Phoenixville, Pennsylvania, and as a head nurse at Fort Myer in Virginia.

Korea
In August 1950, she was deployed to Inchon to serve in the Korean War. She was posted to the 4th Field Hospital for seven months, and later described the conditions in the hospital there as worse than those in India in World War II, due to the cold temperatures in the operating room and a lack of supplies.

During the next fourteen months, she and 31 other nurses treated more than 25,000 patients. As she had done in India, Hays spent some of her off-duty time in Korea assisting chaplains by playing a field pump organ for church services, some of which were held on the front lines. Following her tour in Korea, Hays was transferred to Tokyo Army Hospital in April 1951 and served a year there. A year later, she was transferred to Fort Indiantown Gap, Pennsylvania, as an obstetric and pediatric director.

After graduating from the Nursing Service Administration Course at Fort Sam Houston in San Antonio, Texas, she was appointed head nurse at the Walter Reed Hospital in Washington D.C. emergency room, where she served as the head nurse of the Radioisotope Clinic. During this time she was selected as one of three private nurses for President Dwight D. Eisenhower after he became ill with ileitis; on her retirement she said that this experience was one of the most memorable of her nursing career.

In October 1960, she became the chief nurse of the 11th Evacuation Hospital in Pusan. From 1963 to 1966, she was assistant chief of the Army Nurse Corps. In July 1967, she was promoted to the rank of Colonel, and on September 1 of the same year she was appointed chief of the Corps, a position she held until her retirement on August 31, 1971.

During the Vietnam War, Hays travelled to Vietnam three times to monitor American nurses stationed there. She also managed the development of new training programs and an increase in the number of nurses serving overseas.

On May 15, 1970, President Richard Nixon appointed Hays to the rank of brigadier general and on June 11, 1970, she was promoted at a ceremony, officiated by the Army Chief of Staff, General William C. Westmoreland, and the Secretary of the Army, Stanley R. Resor. Following Hays' promotion, Elizabeth P. Hoisington, Director of the Women's Army Corps, was also promoted to the rank of brigadier general. Hays said in her address to the gathering, that the general stars "reflect[ed] the dedicated, selfless, and often heroic efforts of Army nurses throughout the world since 1901 in time of peace and war."

After her appointment she asked to be dropped off at the army officers' club front entrance, countering the prevailing occupational sexism. Although entitled to enter and use the club before, female officers were expected to come through the side entrance.

Hays made a number of recommendations regarding the treatment of women, which were accepted into military policy, including not automatically discharging who became pregnant and not determining appointments to the Army Nurse Corps Reserve based on the age of a nurse's dependents. In addition, regulations were changed to allow spouses of female service members to claim similar privileges to spouses of male service members.

Recognition
In addition to the military honors Hays received, her service was also recognized in her native Lehigh Valley; in 2015, Lehigh and Northampton counties named the Coplay-Northampton Bridge in her honor. In 2012, she was named to Lehigh County's Hall of Fame. In November 2017, she was presented with a Flag of Valor quilt during a Veterans Day ceremony at Knollwood.  

In June 2020, Allentown School District in Allentown, Pennsylvania named one of Allentown's 15 elementary schools in her honor. The elementary school, Brigadier General Anna Mae Hays Elementary School. Completed in August 2020, Brigadier General Anna Mae Hays Elementary School is located at 1227 West Gordon Street in Allentown.

Personal life
In July 1956, she married William A. Hays, who directed the Sheltered Workshops that provided jobs for disabled people in Washington D.C. William Hays died in 1962. <find-a-grave></ref>

Death
Hays died at Knollwood Retirement Facility in Washington, D.C., on January 7, 2018, at age 97, from complications of a heart attack. 

Three days later, Pennsylvania governor Tom Wolf ordered the state flag at the Pennsylvania State Capitol in Harrisburg and at all state facilities in Allentown to fly at half staff in honor to her death.

Hays was eligible to buried at Arlington National Cemetery, but had chosen instead to be buried with her parents in Grandview Cemetery in South Whitehall Township, Pennsylvania in her native Lehigh County, Pennsylvania.

Decorations

See also

 List of female United States military generals and flag officers
 Timeline of women in warfare in the United States from 1900 to 1949
 Women in the military
 Women in the military in the Americas

References

Bibliography

1920 births
2018 deaths
Military personnel from Buffalo, New York
Recipients of the Legion of Merit
Female generals of the United States Army
United States Army Nurse Corps officers
American nursing administrators
United States Army personnel of the Korean War
Women in warfare post-1945
Women in war in East Asia
Female United States Army nurses in World War II
Columbia University School of Nursing alumni
Catholic University of America alumni
American women's rights activists
Recipients of the Distinguished Service Medal (US Army)
21st-century American women
William Allen High School alumni